Tero or TERO may refer to:
Tero (given name)
Police Tero F.C., a Thai football club based in Bangkok
BEC-TERO, an entertainment conglomerate in Thailand
Tero Saarinen Company, a Finnish dance group 
Lawrence Tero, the actor/wrestler known professionally as "Mr. T"